Sven Anders Peter "Dala" Dahlkvist (born 30 May 1955) is a Swedish former footballer who played as a centre back. He represented AIK and Örebro SK during a career that spanned between 1974 and 1992. A full international between 1979 and 1985, he won 39 caps and scored four goals for the Sweden national team.

In 1984, he was awarded Guldbollen as Sweden's best footballer of the year.

Career 
Sven was a successful forward and defender who began his career in Allsvenskan with AIK in 1974. He was a key player for the club until 1987. He then played for Örebro SK 1988–1992.

He played 39 games for the Swedish national team, scored four goals and won the Guldbollen in 1984.

After his playing career he has worked as a coach and club director for Örebro SK 1993–1999, then as a coach for Eskilstuna City FK.

Personal life 
His daughter Lisa Dahlkvist is a professional footballer who has played for Umeå IK and the Swedish women's national team.

Career statistics

International 
International goals

Honours 
AIK

 Svenska Cupen: 1975–76, 1984–85

Individual

 Guldbollen: 1984
 Stor Grabb: 1983

References

External links

1955 births
Living people
Allsvenskan players
AIK Fotboll players
Örebro SK players
Swedish footballers
Sweden international footballers
Swedish football managers
Örebro SK managers
Eskilstuna City FK managers
Association football defenders
People from Gagnef Municipality
Sportspeople from Dalarna County